Kachinia is a small genus of southeast Asian goblin spiders. It was first described by Y. F. Tong, H. F. Chen and S. J. Liu in 2018, and it has only been found in Myanmar.  it contains only two species: K. mahmolae and K. putao.

See also
 List of Oonopidae species

References

Oonopidae genera
Arthropods of Myanmar